Ryan Anderson may refer to:

Basketball players
Ryan Anderson (basketball, born 1987), US basketball player in Canada, who played in college for Nebraska
Ryan Anderson (basketball, born 1988), US basketball player in the NBA, who played in college for California
Ryan Anderson (basketball, born 1992), US basketball player in Germany, played college basketball for Boston College & Arizona

Others
Ryan Anderson (baseball) (born 1979),  baseball pitcher
Ryan G. Anderson (born 1978), U.S. National Guard specialist convicted of aiding the enemy in 2004
Ryan Anderson (cyclist) (born 1987), Canadian racing cyclist
Ryan Anderson (linebacker) (born 1994), American football linebacker
Ryan Anderson (punter) (born 1995), American football punter
Ryan Anderson (monster truck driver) (born 1989), American monster truck driver
Ryan Anderson (musher) (born 1981), dog musher and dog sled racer from Minnesota
Ryan T. Anderson (born 1981 or 1982), American conservative political scientist
Ryan Anderson, American monster truck driver and son of Dennis Anderson